Harlan Estate is a California wine estate producing Bordeaux style blends. The estate is located in the western hills of Oakville, California within the Oakville AVA, in the Napa Valley AVA zone.

Harlan Estate is a well-known "cult winery," commanding high prices due to limited availability, and high demand from followers of Robert Parker.  Its flagship Harlan Estate is one of the most sought-after Californian wines in the market, with the average price per bottle reaching $1,012. In addition to there estate wine, they also  produce a second wine named The Maiden.

Beginning production in 1997, Harlan also founded BOND.

History
H. William Harlan, was an established real estate developer and Napa Valley resort owner. In 1984 he purchased a  property including a forested area with steep hillsides, multiple elevations and exposures. Located west of Martha's Vineyard in Oakville, he proceeded to clear  for viticulture, with Harlan's expressed ambition to "create a first growth wine".

The first Harlan Estate wine label - a design inspired by a 19th-century engraving - was overseen by retired U.S. Treasury engraver Herb Fichter. It was 10 years in the making, from when Bill Harlan first started his search for an engraver to the release of the 1990 vintage in 1996. As its qualities, Harlan has stated, "It was a label designed for a bottle that would sit on a table in candlelight, not on a store shelf."

Described by Jancis Robinson as "one of the ten best wines of the twentieth century", and consistent acclaim from Wine Spectator, and Robert Parker, including four scores of 100 "parker points", have further contributed to the wine's high prices and long waiting lists. Released at $850 per bottle, the price soon rises on the speculative market, and the cost may range from $1200 and up. A 10-vintage vertical selection of magnum bottles sold at the 2000 Napa Valley Wine Auction for $700,000.

The Director of Wine Making, Bob Levy, has worked with Harlan since 1983 when Harlan took part in founding the Merryvale Winery, and since 1989 the estate has retained Michel Rolland as consultant enologist. Construction of the current winery was completed in 2002.

Production
The estate extends , of which approximately 15% of the land,  is cultivated with the grape varieties Cabernet Sauvignon, Merlot, Cabernet Franc and Petit Verdot.

References

External links
 Harlan Estate official site

Wineries in Napa Valley
1984 establishments in California